Terthroptera is a genus of ermine moths (family Yponomeutidae). They belong to the large subfamily Yponomeutinae.

This genus includes a mere two known species from southern Polynesia. They are small moths with wingspans less than 2 cm (1 inch), and are characterized by their 8-veined hindwings, with veins 3 and 4 separate and veins 5 and 6 unstalked.

The species are:
 Terthroptera astochia J.F.G.Clarke, 1986
 Terthroptera eremosesia J.F.G.Clarke, 1971

Footnotes

References
  (1986): Pyralidae and Microlepidoptera of the Marquesas Archipelago. Smithsonian Contributions to Zoology 416: 1-485. PDF fulltext (214 MB!)

Yponomeutidae